Malkapur is a town in Satara district in the southern part of Indian state of Maharashtra.  It lies beside the city of Karad and along the NH4 highway. It had one of the highest revenue-generating (through taxes) Gram Panchayats in Maharashtra. Later on due to increasing population and urbanization it was given the status of a town having Municipal Council. The town is well known for its 24×7 water supply to each and every house and at very cheap cost. It is also implementing Solar City Project in which municipal council gives subsidy on purchasing any solar-powered equipment and reducing power dependency on MSEB. Malkapur town is divided into 17 wards for which elections are held every 5 years.

History
Originally Malkapur was a village with small population near the Karad city. The basic occupation was agriculture with the educated people travelling to Karad and Satara for employment. Due to limited space available in Karad and the proximity to NH4 highway lot of businesses started in Malkapur. People started flooding in here which lead to the establishment of schools, hospitals, shops, commercial centers, etc. Eventually, it was declared as a town with a Municipal Council.

Public Schemes

Malkapur 24x7 Water Supply Scheme
As per the demand of people of Malkapur Grampanchayat, it was decided to plan and execute 24x7 Water Supply Scheme by adopting Koyana River as a perennial source and accordingly the proposal was framed for a projected population of 67196 for year 2037 and submitted to Govt. for approval.

Shrimati Premala Tai Kanya Suraksha Campaign
This scheme deals with the problem of prenatal sex determination and female foeticide.

Priya Darshani Kanya Ratna Yojna
Under this campaign, girls will be issued free bus passes from mahila and bal kalyan fund. Malkapur Nagarpanchayat has decided as social obligations to initiate and execute the scheme to issue free transport bus passes to girl students taking education in various schools & colleges situated in Karad city and adjoining areas. The scheme is being implemented since 8 July 2013, the date of death anniversary of late Mrs. Premalatai Chavan. Under this scheme as on today 792, free bus passes have been issued to girl students by Malkapur Nagarpanchayat through Women & Child Welfare fund.

Biogas
The Maharashtra government irrigation and health and hygiene department gives grants to the people to construct toilets. As 40% farmers in the town/ city practise animal husbandry, the council implemented its own scheme to grant 10,000 rupees for poor families, peasants and farmers to develop bio-gas plants.

Malkapur Solar City
As per Jawaharlal National solar mission, Malkapur municipal council have planned Malkapur solar city. Through this plan solarpower is harvested to its maximum capacity, Malkapur municipal council has planned to distribute minimum one solar water heater and at least two solar lamps in every house. The plan is divided into four stages, the first phase will be of 700 connections and remaining all three phases will be of 1500 connections.

Garodar Mata Dattak Yojna

Geography
It has an average elevation of 566 metres (1856 feet). Malkapur is located near Aghashiv hill. It has been referred in Mahabharata. The hill has the shape of an "Aum" (Devanagari?) when viewed aerially.

Climate
Malkapur belongs to the subtropical category of climate characterized by medium to heavy rainfall and moderate temperature. Three main seasons in the region are:
Rainy Season (June to Sept)
Winter season (Oct to Jan)
Summer Season (Feb to May)

Average maximum temperature is 36 °C and minimum temperature is 11 °C. May is the hottest and December is coldest month of the year. The maximum rainfall is in June to Aug from south-west monsoon. The average rainfall is 540.40 mm in Malkapur.

Demographics
The Malkapur Nagar Panchayat has population of 31,671 of which 16,352 are males while 15,319 are females as per report released by Census India 2011.

Population of Children with age of 0–6 is 3576 which is 11.29% of total population of Malkapur (NP). In Malkapur Nagar Panchayat, Female Sex Ratio is of 937 against state average of 929. Moreover, Child Sex Ratio in Malkapur is around 882 compared to Maharashtra state average of 894. Literacy rate of Malkapur city is 88.14% higher than state average of 82.34%. In Malkapur, Male literacy is around 92.37% while female literacy rate is 83.65%.

Transportation

Railways
 Karad – 8 km from city
Nearest railway station is Karad and has trains on route from Mumbai to Miraj, Sangli, Kolhapur, and Bangalore (some trains).
You can reach Malkapur from Mumbai or Pune easily by road or rail (Mahalaxmi Express, Koyna Express, Sahyadri Express or Chalukya Express).

Nearest railway junction

 Miraj – 72 km
All super-fast trains like the Karnataka Sampark Kranti, Deekshaboomi Express, Rani Chenama Express, Haripriya Express and Miraj Hubli Express stop at Miraj Junction.  You can take private cars or MSRTC buses from Miraj to Malkapur. Travel time from Miraj to Malkapur is approximately 1 hour 15 minutes.

National Highways
The National Highway 4 goes by Malkapur city. National Highway 4 (NH 4) is a major National Highway in Western and Southern India. NH 4 links four of the 10 most populous Indian cities - Mumbai, Pune, Bangalore, and Chennai.

Airport
The nearest passenger airport is Kolhapur Airport

Education
High schools

KCT's Krishna English Medium, Malkapur, Karad.
Anandrao Chavan Vidyalaya, Malkapur, Karad
Rotary School, Malkapur, Karad.
Star English Medium School, Malkapur, Karad
Shrimati Premlatai Chavan Kanya Shala, Malkapur, Karad

Engineering colleges

Shri Santkrupa College of Engineering, Ghogaoan, Karad
Dr. Daulatrao Aher College of Engineering, Karad

Arts, Science, and Commerce colleges
KCT's Jr. College of Science Malkapur, Karad

Polytechnic colleges
Shri SanShri Santtkrupa Polytechnic College, Ghogaoan, Karad

Other colleges
Krishna Institute of Medical Sciences, Malkapur, Karad

Bharti Vidyapeeth Law College, Malkapur, Karad
Yashavantrao Mohite Institute of Management, Malkapur, Karad
Jaywant International School, Wathar

Tourism
Some tourist points near Malkapur include:

Preeti Sangam (Confluence of Koyna & Krishna River) + Krishna Mai Temple + Late Yashwantrao Chavan's Samadhi.
Koyna Dam 40  km
Chandoli Dam 55  km 
Uttarmand Dam 38 km
Sadashivgad
Agashiv Caves
Gol Ghummat (Kaapil)
Naktya Rawalchi Vihir (Ancient Well)
Masjid Built by Sultan Ali Adilshah (1557- 1580)
Ram Mandir Chaphal 35 km
Talbid (Ram Mandir and Vasant fort) 12 km
Sagareshwar Wildlife Sanctuary
Valmiki Temple & Big Wild Area(45 km from Dhebevadi Fata)
Pachawadeswar (Narayanwadi)8 km
Kaas plateau 86 km
Thoseghar Waterfall 86 km
Walmiki  45 km

Controversies

Sanjay Patil Murder Case
Wrestler and winner of the Maharashtra Kesari title Sanjay Patil was shot dead on 15 January 2009 near Krishna hospital in Malkapur. Salim alias Sallya Chepya of Karad and eight others were arrested by the Karad police in connection with the murder and a charge sheet was also filed in the court.

Notable people
 Prithviraj Chavan: He was the 17th Chief Minister of Maharashtra. Chavan served as the Minister of State in the Prime Minister's Office in the Ministry of Parliamentary Affairs and Ministry of Personnel, Public Grievances, and Pensions. Chavan was also General Secretary of the All-India Congress Committee (AICC), in-charge of many states, including Jammu and Kashmir, Karnataka, Haryana, Gujarat, Tripura, and Arunachal Pradesh.
 Shri. Manohar Shinde (Chair Person)
Shri. Suhas Anandrao Jadhav (Vice chairman of MalaiDevi Patsanstha)

See also
 Malkapur Municipal Council

References

Cities and towns in Satara district
Talukas in Maharashtra